is a railway station in the city of Motomiya, Fukushima Prefecture, Japan, operated by East Japan Railway Company (JR East).

Lines

Station layout
The station has two opposed side platforms. The station is unattended.

Platforms

History
Gohyakugawa Station opened on December 15, 1948. The station was absorbed into the JR East network upon the privatization of the Japanese National Railways (JNR) on April 1, 1987.

Surrounding area
Asahi Beer Fukushima factory

See also
 List of Railway Stations in Japan

External links

 

Stations of East Japan Railway Company
Railway stations in Fukushima Prefecture
Tōhoku Main Line
Railway stations in Japan opened in 1948
Motomiya, Fukushima